Mount Horeb Public School is located in Mount Horeb, Wisconsin. It was added to the National Register of Historic Places in 2010.

History
The school was built to educate elementary and high school students in Mount Horeb. In 1941, the building was expanded. Currently, first and second grade students are educated there.

The original and largest part of the school was designed in 1918 by Madison architects Claude & Starck. These were designed by Madison architects Law, Law, and Potter.

References

School buildings on the National Register of Historic Places in Wisconsin
Public elementary schools in Wisconsin
Public high schools in Wisconsin
Schools in Dane County, Wisconsin
Prairie School architecture in Wisconsin
School buildings completed in 1918
Public middle schools in Wisconsin
National Register of Historic Places in Dane County, Wisconsin
1918 establishments in Wisconsin